John W. Kittredge (born September 28, 1956) is a justice of the South Carolina Supreme Court. He is a graduate of the University of South Carolina School of Law and formerly a Court of Appeals judge for the state from 2003 to 2008. He was elected on February 5, 2008, to replace Justice James E. Moore, and took office on August 1, 2008.

References

1956 births
Living people
American Presbyterians
Politicians from Greenville, South Carolina
South Carolina state court judges
Justices of the South Carolina Supreme Court
University of South Carolina School of Law alumni
21st-century American judges